The Tower of Campumoru is a Genoese tower located in the commune of Belvédère-Campomoro (Corse-du-Sud) on the west coast of the French island of Corsica.

The tower was designed by Carlo Spinosa and built between 1585 and 1586 by the master-mason Giorgio Canton. It was one of a series of coastal defences constructed by the Republic of Genoa between 1530 and 1620 to stem the attacks by Barbary pirates. In 1992 the tower was listed as one of the official historical monuments of France.

Since 1986 the tower has been owned and maintained by a French government agency, the Conservatoire du littoral. The agency plans to purchase  of the headland and as of 2011 had acquired .

See also
List of Genoese towers in Corsica

References

External links
 Includes information on how to reach 90 towers and many photographs.

Towers in Corsica
Monuments historiques of Corsica